Jarvis Jai Cleal is an English footballer who plays as a midfielder and wing-back for North Carolina State University. He had previously played in the English Football League for Plymouth Argyle.

Career
Cleal was born in Yeovil, and left home aged 14 to join the West Bromwich Albion academy set-up. He left West Brom in the summer of 2018 and signed for Plymouth Argyle in October later that year.

On 28 January 2020 he first made an appearance in a match day squad, as an unused substitute in an EFL League Two match between Plymouth Argyle and Crawley Town, the game finished 2–2. Afterwards, manager Ryan Lowe praised Cleal as having done "great in the youth system," and challenged him to make the step up and "thrive and push on now."

Cleal made his professional debut on 7 March 2020 in an EFL League Two match between Argyle and Macclesfield Town, coming on as a substitute at right wing-back with just a few minutes left to play. Argyle won the match 3–0.

Cleal was released by The Pilgrims at the end of the 2020–21 season.

References

Year of birth missing (living people)
Living people
People from Yeovil
English footballers
Plymouth Argyle F.C. players
Association football midfielders